Little River-Academy is a city in Bell County, Texas, United States. The population was 1,992 at the 2020 census. It is part of the Killeen–Temple–Fort Hood Metropolitan Statistical Area.

Geography

Little River-Academy is located southeast of the center of Bell County at  (30.9851, –97.3551).

Demographics

As of the 2020 United States census, there were 1,992 people, 730 households, and 503 families residing in the city.

As of the census of 2000, there were 1,645 people, 584 households, and 439 families residing in the city. The population density was 599.3 people per square mile (231.8/km). There were 618 housing units at an average density of 225.1 per square mile (87.1/km). The racial makeup of the city was 88.75% White, 0.36% African American, 0.36% Indigenous American, 0.55% Asian, 6.81% from other races, and 3.16% from two or more races. Hispanic or Latino of any race were 12.22% of the population.

There were 584 households, out of which 43.5% had children under the age of 18 living with them, 58.9% were married couples living together, 11.6% had a female householder with no husband present, and 24.7% were non-families. 20.7% of all households were made up of individuals, and 10.6% had someone living alone who was 65 years of age or older. The average household size was 2.82 and the average family size was 3.29.

In the city, the population was spread out, with 32.2% under the age of 18, 7.8% from 18 to 24, 31.6% from 25 to 44, 17.9% from 45 to 64, and 10.5% who were 65 years of age or older. The median age was 33 years. For every 100 females, there were 95.6 males. For every 100 females age 18 and over, there were 88.8 males.

The median income for a household in the city was $39,063, and the median income for a family was $45,625. Males had a median income of $32,500 versus $21,081 for females. The per capita income for the city was $15,236. About 6.2% of families and 9.9% of the population were below the poverty line, including 12.5% of those under age 18 and 17.5% of those age 65 or over.

History 
There was a fort here, built in 1836, named Fort Griffin. Because of fights with Native Americans, early Texans settled near the fort. The railroad came to town in 1880, and the post office in 1886. By 1914, there were 250 inhabitants. The towns of Little River and Academy merged in 1989 to form Little River-Academy.

Education 
Little River-Academy is served by the Academy Independent School District.

AISD has four schools: Academy Early Childhood Center, Academy Elementary School, Academy Middle School, and Academy High School.

Academy is also home to Bell County Alternative School, which serves Holland, Salado, Bartlett, Troy, and Rogers.

References

Cities in Bell County, Texas
Cities in Texas
Populated places established in 1836
Killeen–Temple–Fort Hood metropolitan area
1836 establishments in the Republic of Texas